The Santa Ana–Huntington Beach Line is a former Pacific Electric interurban railway line in Orange County, California. A single car provided a suburban service between Huntington Beach and the sugar refineries in La Bolsa.

History
The railway route served as a Southern Pacific steam railway line prior to 1911, when the section between Huntington Beach and La Bolsa was electrified by the Pacific Electric. Passenger service began that February and was utilized by workers at three sugar refineries at La Bolsa. The refineries closed starting in 1923, greatly reducing passenger demand on the line. Service was discontinued after November 9, 1928.

Freight
The sugar refineries were a large source of freight revenue for the line. Traffic continued into the 1950s, long outlasting passenger service.

References

Pacific Electric routes
Light rail in California
1911 establishments in California
Railway services discontinued in 1928
1928 disestablishments in California
Closed railway lines in the United States